The Football League Trophy 1995–96, known as the Auto Windscreens Shield 1995–96 for sponsorship reasons, was the 13th staging of the Football League Trophy, a knock-out competition for English football clubs in the Second and Third Divisions (now known as League One and Two).

The winners were Rotherham United, who defeated Shrewsbury Town 2–1 in the final.

The competition began on 25 September 1995 and ended with the final on 14 April 1996.

The tournament begins with clubs divided into a Northern and a Southern section, and teams entering a group stage. Each section then gradually eliminates the qualifying teams in knock-out fashion until each has a winning finalist. At this point, the two winning finalists face each other in the combined final for the honour of the trophy.

First round

Northern Section

The placings in this group were decided by drawing lots.

Southern Section

Second round

Northern Section

Southern Section

Area-quarter-finals

Northern Section

Southern Section

Area semi-finals

Northern Section

Southern Section

Area finals

Northern Area final

Southern Area final

Final

MATCH RULES
90 minutes.
30 minutes of extra-time if necessary.
Penalty shoot-out if scores still level.
Maximum of 3 substitutions.

Notes

External links
Official website

EFL Trophy
Tro